Isabel Andrea Cademartori Dujisin (born 9 January 1988) is a German politician who was elected as Member of the Bundestag for Mannheim in the 2021 federal election.

Early life 
Cademartori was born in Bad Saarow-Pieskow. She graduated from the University of Mannheim Business School.

Political career 
Cademartori served as a city councillor in Mannheim since 2019.

Cademartori was elected to the Bundestag in the 2021 German federal election.

Other activities 
 Federal Network Agency for Electricity, Gas, Telecommunications, Posts and Railway (BNetzA), Alternate Member of the Rail Infrastructure Advisory Council (since 2022)
 Business Forum of the Social Democratic Party of Germany, Member of the Political Advisory Board (since 2022)

Personal life 
Cademartori's grandfather, the economist and political scientist José Cademartori (* 1930) was a member of the Communist Party of Chile and under Salvador Allende was briefly Minister for Economy, Development and Reconstruction between July 5, 1973 and September 11.  After the coup in Chile in 1973 by Augusto Pinochet, the family had to flee South America and came to East Germany via Venezuela and Cuba, where her parents met while studying at the University of Leipzig.

See also 
 List of members of the 20th Bundestag

References 

Living people
1988 births
21st-century German politicians
21st-century German women politicians
Female members of the Bundestag
German people of Chilean descent
University of Mannheim alumni
Members of the Bundestag for Baden-Württemberg
Members of the Bundestag for the Social Democratic Party of Germany
Members of the Bundestag 2021–2025